is a Japanese voice actress from Chiba and affiliated with 81 Produce. She is married to voice actor Masaya Takatsuka.

Filmography

Television animation
 Blue Dragon (2007) - Shu
 Gintama (xxxx) - Murata Tetsuko
 Glass Mask (xxxx) - female teacher, Ikeda, Shopkeeper, Sugiyama, Yayoi, Zophie (2005 version)
 Hell Girl (xxxx) - Satsuki Minato, Minami's mother
 Lunar Legend Tsukihime (xxxx) - Shiki Tohno (as a child)
 Mirmo Zibang! (xxxx) - Mambo
 Naruto (xxxx) - Shizune, young Neji Hyuga, Yūgao Uzuki, Tonton
 Rockman.EXE (xxxx) - Bass.EXE (Forte.EXE)
 The Story of Saiunkoku (2006) - Boy 2

Animated films
 Tekken: Blood Vengeance (2011) - Mokujin
The Last: Naruto the Movie (2014) - Shizune

Video games roles
 Mega Man Network Transmission (xxxx) - Bass.EXE (Forte.EXE)

Drama CDs roles
 Amai Tsumi no Kajitsu (xxxx) - Kurihara's Mother

Dubbing roles

Live-action
 42 – Rachel Isum Robinson (Nicole Beharie)
 Aliens in the Attic – Art Pearson (Henri Young)
 Black Nativity – Naima Cobbs (Jennifer Hudson)
 Crazy, Stupid, Love – Hannah Weaver (Emma Stone)
 El tiempo entre costuras – Paquita (Pepa Rus)
 Event 15 – Blau (Kimberly Elise)
 Fever Pitch – Molly (Ione Skye)
 The House Bunny – Natalie (Emma Stone)
 Hustlers – Elizabeth (Julia Stiles)
 Joy Ride 2: Dead Ahead – Kayla Scott (Laura Jordan)
 Lilacs – Marianna (Miriam Sekhon)
 Malignant – Detective Regina Moss (Michole Briana White)
 Numb – Dawn (Stefanie von Pfetten)
 Premium Rush – Vanessa (Dania Ramirez)
 Ramona and Beezus – Beezus Quimby (Selena Gomez)
 The Sandlot: Heading Home – Tommy Santorelli (Keanu Pires)
 The Secret Life of Bees – Rosaleen "July" Daise (Jennifer Hudson)
 Sex and the City – Louise (Jennifer Hudson)
 The Three Stooges – Lydia Harter (Sofía Vergara)
 The Uninvited – Alex Ivers (Arielle Kebbel)
 Vehicle 19 – Rachel Shabangu (Naima McLean)

Animation
 Batman: The Brave and the Bold – Vixen
 Bob the Builder - Trix
 Bob the Builder (2015 TV series) - Muck
 The Boondocks – Riley Freeman
 Dead End: Paranormal Park – Roxie
 The Fairly OddParents – Tootie
 Jimmy Two-Shoes – Jimmy
 Phineas and Ferb – Baljeet
 Thomas And Friends – Molly, Belle, Gina, Daisy (succeeding Yumi Nakatani), Henrietta (succeeding Yumi Nakatani), Hannah, Elizabeth (succeeding Fu Suzuki), Jack (replacing Hideki Nakanishi), Dowager Hatt (succeeding Fu Suzuki) and Stephen Hatt (replacing Takayuki Kawasugi)
 Zootopia – Mrs. Otterton

References

External links
Official agency profile 

1979 births
Living people
Voice actresses from Chiba Prefecture
Japanese voice actresses
Japanese video game actresses
81 Produce voice actors
21st-century Japanese actresses